Environment & Urbanization is a biannual peer-reviewed academic journal covering urban and environmental studies. It is published by SAGE Publications and was established in 1989. Each issue of the journal focuses on a particular theme.

Abstracting and indexing 
The journal is abstracted and indexed in:
 Current Contents/Social and Behavioral Science
 GEOBASE
 International Bibliography of the Social Sciences
 Social Sciences Citation Index
According to the Journal Citation Reports, the journal has a 20178impact factor of 3.015, ranking it seventh among 40 journals in the category "Urban Studies".

Scope 
The journal focuses on urban issues in Africa, Asia, and Latin America because these regions have most of the world's urban population. It is available free to teaching or training institutions and non-governmental organizations in low- and middle-income countries. Articles can be submitted in French, Spanish, or Portuguese and, if accepted for publication, are translated into English at the journal's expenses.

To reach a more general public who may not usually read academic journals, a five-page Environment and Urbanization Brief appears with each issue.

History 
Environment & Urbanization was established in 1989 by the International Institute for Environment and Development (IIED) to fill a perceived gap in coverage of urban issues in Africa, Asia, and Latin America. It was based on a Spanish-language journal of the same name (Medio Ambiente y Urbanización) that had been set up in 1983 by IIED’s sister institution in Argentina, IIED-America Latina. Both journals sought to give more prominence to urban issues, especially those linked to urban poverty. Another related journal, Environment & Urbanization ASIA, was launched in 2010, edited by Om Prakash Mathur and published by SAGE Publications India, in response to the fact that half the world's urban population now lives in Asia.

Environment & Urbanization was first published on the web in 1994 with free access to issues older than two years. SAGE Publications began publishing the journal from 2006. A selection of papers is available in Chinese.

References

External links 
 

Urban studies and planning journals
SAGE Publishing academic journals
Publications established in 1989
Biannual journals
English-language journals
Environmental planning
Urbanization
Environmental social science journals